Soudabeh Fazaeli (born in 1947) is a prominent Iranian author, researcher and translator, specially known for her works in the field of mythology and semiotics. Over four decades of prolific career, she has published more than 40 books among which are some of the most referenced works in scholarly articles, writings and academic journals. Fazaeli studied English Literature (1969-1972) at the University of Cambridge, Cambridge, Pahlavi Language (1976), and Comparative Literature (1973-1977) at the Paris-Sorbonne University, Paris. For the time being, she lives in Tehran and has recently finished her third novel in Persian

.

Works
 Farhang-i Namād-hā (Dictionnaire des symboles: mythes, reves, coutumes)(1999/ 1378) by Jean Chevalier, Alain Gheerbrant, translated into Persian by Soudabeh Fazaeli
 Rooh-e Naghamat (L'ame des sons) (2004) by Jean During;  translated into Persian by Soudabeh Fazaeli
 Mousighi Va Erfan (1999) by Jean During; translated into Persian by Soudabeh Fazaeli
 Tarot des Bohemiens by Papus (1994) by Gerard Encausse (Papus); translated by Soudabeh Fazaeli 
 Religion in Ancient History (1969) by S. G. F. Brandon; translated into Persian by Soudabeh Fazaeli
 Mythological Motifs in Iranian Contemporary Stories: (Derakht-e Anjir-e Maābed, Bāghe Anāri, Jāee Digar, Kājhāye Mowarrab) by Roqayyeh Mahmoodiwand-Bakhtyari, Parvaneh Adelzadeh, Kamran Pashayi Fakhri; translated by Soudabeh Fazaeli

References

External links
Amazon: Soudabeh Fazaeli
goodreads: Soudabeh Fazaeli 
adinehbook: Soudabeh Fazaeli 
Ferdowsi University Library: Soudabeh Fazaeli 
From Myth to Religion according to Protestant Priest
Contemporary Iranian Writers

Iranian writers
Iranian women writers
Living people
Iranian academics
Paris-Sorbonne University alumni
Alumni of the University of Cambridge
1947 births